Jani Rama (born 12 November 1944) is an Albanian footballer. He played in four matches for the Albania national football team from 1967 to 1973.

References

External links
 

1944 births
Living people
Albanian footballers
Albania international footballers
Place of birth missing (living people)
Association footballers not categorized by position